Pond is a collection of 20 short stories written by Claire-Louise Bennett, originally published by The Stinging Fly Press in Ireland on 10 May 2015.
The stories are written from the perspective of one woman (who is never named, an unnamed protagonist), who lives a solitary existence on the outskirts of a small coastal village.

It focuses on the details of her daily experience, from the best way to eat porridge to an encounter with a cow to the ending of an affair.
The shortest story in Pond runs to only a couple of sentences.

Reception
Pond was well received in both the UK and the US, and was featured in both The New Yorker and The New York Times in 2016.

Stories

References 

2015 short story collections
British short story collections
Literature by women